Brassia lanceana, or Lance's brassia, is a species of orchid. It is native to Trinidad & Tobago, Venezuela, Guyana, Suriname, French Guiana, Colombia, Panama, Ecuador, Peru and northern Brazil.

References

lanceana
Orchids of South America
Orchids of Panama
Flora of Trinidad and Tobago
Plants described in 1835
Flora without expected TNC conservation status